The taxonomy of scorpions deals with the classification of this predatory arthropod into 13 extant families and about 1,400 described species and subspecies. In addition, 111 described taxa of extinct scorpions are known.

The classification is based on that of Soleglad and Fet (2003), which replaced the older, unpublished classification of Stockwell. Additional taxonomic changes are from papers by Soleglad et al. (2005).
The classification proposed by Fet and Soleglad in 2003 and subsequent papers has not been universally accepted; some authorities have challenged their methodology as invalid.

Taxonomy
Order Scorpiones
 Infraorder Orthosterni  Pocock, 1911 
 Parvorder Pseudochactida  Soleglad et Fet, 2003 
 Superfamily Pseudochactoidea  Gromov, 1998 
 Family Pseudochactidae  Gromov, 1998 
 Parvorder Buthida  Soleglad et Fet, 2003 
 Superfamily Buthoidea  C. L. Koch, 1837 
 Family Buthidae  C. L. Koch, 1837 (thick-tailed scorpions)
 Family Microcharmidae  Lourenço, 1996 
 Parvorder Chaerilida  Soleglad et Fet, 2003 
 Superfamily Chaeriloidea  Pocock, 1893 
 Family Chaerilidae  Pocock, 1893 
 Subfamily Chearilinae  Pocock, 1893 
 † Subfamily Electrochearilinae Fet, Soleglad et Anderson  2004  (extinct)
 Parvorder Iurida  Soleglad et Fet, 2003 
 Superfamily Chactoidea  Pocock, 1893 
 Family Chactidae  Pocock, 1893 
 Subfamily Chactinae  Pocock, 1893 
 Tribe Chactini  Pocock, 1893 
 Tribe Nullibrotheini  Soleglad et Fet, 2003 
 Subfamily Brotheinae  Simon, 1879 
 Tribe Belisariini  Lourenço, 1998 
 Tribe Brotheini  Simon, 1879 
 Subtribe Brotheina  Simon, 1879 
 Subtribe Neochactina  Soleglad et Fet, 2003 
 Subfamily Uroctoninae
 Family Euscorpiidae  Laurie, 1896 
 Subfamily Euscorpiinae  Laurie, 1896 
 Subfamily Megacorminae  Kraepelin, 1905 
 Tribe Chactopsini  Soleglad et Sissom, 2001 
 Tribe Megacormini  Kraepelin, 1905 
 Subfamily Scorpiopinae  Kraepelin, 1905 
 Tribe Scorpiopini  Kraepelin, 1905 
 Tribe Troglocormini  Soleglad et Sissom, 2001 
 Family Superstitioniidae  Stahnke, 1940 
 Subfamily Superstitioniinae  Stahnke, 1940 
 Subfamily Typlochactinae  Mitchell, 1971 
 Family Vaejovidae  Thorell, 1876 
 Superfamily Iuroidea  Thorell, 1876 
 Family Caraboctonidae  Kraepelin, 1905 (hairy scorpions)
 Subfamily Caraboctoninae  Kraepelin, 1905 
 Subfamily Hadrurinae  Stahnke, 1974 
 Family Iuridae  Thorell, 1876 
 Superfamily Scorpionoidea  Latreille, 1802 
 Family Bothriuridae  Simon, 1880 
 Subfamily Bothriurinae  Simon, 1880 
 Subfamily Lisposominae  Lawrence, 1928 
 Family Hemiscorpiidae  Pocock, 1893 (= Ischnuridae, =Liochelidae) (rock scorpions, creeping scorpions, or tree scorpions)
 Subfamily Hemiscorpiinae  Pocock, 1893 
 Subfamily Heteroscorpioninae  Kraepelin, 1905 
 Subfamily Hormurinae  Laurie, 1896 
 † Family Protoischnuridae Carvalho et Lourenço 2001  (extinct)
 Family Scorpionidae  Latreille, 1802 (burrowing scorpions or pale-legged scorpions)
 Subfamily Diplocentrinae  Karsch, 1880 
 Tribe Diplocentrini  Karsch, 1880 
 Tribe Nebini  Kraepelin, 1905 
 Subfamily Scorpioninae  Latreille, 1802 
 Subfamily Urodacinae  Pocock, 1893 
 Superfamily incertae sedis
 † Family Palaeoeuscorpiidae  Lourenço 2003  (extinct)
Parvorder incertae sedis
 † Family Archaeobuthidae  Lourenço 2003  (extinct)
 † Family Palaeopisthacanthidae  Kjellesvig-Wæring 1986  (extinct)
 † Family Protobuthidae  Lourenço et Gall 2003  (extinct)
 † Family incertae sedis (contains genera Corniops Jeram 1994; Palaeoburmesebuthus Lourenço 2002; Sinoscorpius Hong 1983).

References